3 x 4 Eye is an album by jazz saxophonist Roscoe Mitchell and the Sound Ensemble recorded in 1981 for the Italian Black Saint label.

Reception
The Allmusic review by Ron Wynn awarded the album 3½ stars stating "This isn't among his most intense or combative dates, but Mitchell and the Sound Ensemble are still well worth hearing".

Track listing
All compositions by Roscoe Mitchell
 "Cut Outs for Quintet" – 17:24 
 "Jo Jar" – 4:44 
 "3 x 4 Eye" – 12:11 
 "Variations on a Folk Song Written in the Sixties" – 6:47 
Recorded at Barigozzi Studio in Milano, Italy on February 18 & 19, 1981

Personnel
Roscoe Mitchell – soprano saxophone, alto saxophone
Hugh Ragin – piccolo trumpet, trumpet, flugelhorn
A. Spencer Barefiled – guitar
Jaribu Shahid – bass, congas
Tani Tabbal – percussion

References

Black Saint/Soul Note albums
Roscoe Mitchell albums
1981 albums